Wan Yanhai (born 20 November 1963) is a Chinese AIDS activist.

Dr. Wan started his career at China's Ministry of Health (MOH), where among other things he translated the first announcement of the AIDS epidemic into Chinese. He set up the first HIV/AIDS telephone hotline in China where people could obtain comprehensive information on HIV/AIDS.

After this, he  focused much of his AIDS work on advocating for health care and human rights of people with AIDS living in Henan Province, where there was a coverup of blood selling businesses connected to local officials infected tens of thousands (as many as a million) men, women, and children with the AIDS virus. He expanded his work to advocate for the health of injection drug users, sex workers, and other marginalized groups disproportionately affected by the AIDS epidemic. He was co-founder of the Beijing LGBT Center, the first gay community center in China.  His "frank and aggressive" approach toward AIDS has led to frequent run-ins with authorities and landed him in detention three times in the past 12 years, including a month-long detention in 2002 that made international headlines and sparked a successful international campaign for his release.

Dr. Wan has won numerous human rights awards, is a former Fulbright Fellow and Yale University Global Fellow, and signed China's groundbreaking Charter 08 on human rights, of which Nobel Laureate and Wan's friend Liu Xiaobo is the first signatory. Dr. Wan is currently the director of the country's foremost AIDS-awareness group, the Beijing-based Aizhixing Institute of Health Education. (The Chinese characters for "Aizhixing" (愛知行)  represent love, knowledge and action and are a play on the Chinese word for AIDS.)

On 24 August 2002 he disappeared and was later found to be detained by police after attending a film screening at a Beijing gay and lesbian film festival and charged with the leaking of an internal government report into the Bloodhead scandal in Henan Province. He was released a month later on 20 September.

From 6 to 9 November 2006, he attended an international meeting in Indonesia for The Yogyakarta Principles as one of 29 experts. After the meeting he has gotten his most recent detention on November 24, 2006 - this time a three-day detention prompted by his efforts to organize a public forum on HIV/AIDS to coincide with World AIDS Day. After his release on November 27, 2006, Wan accused Chinese leaders of falling "asleep" as the virus spreads. He was also forced by the government to cancel his "Blood Safety, AIDS and Legal Human Rights Workshop" (due to have taken place between 25 and 30 November 2006).

As the Charter 08 by Liu Xiaobo was published on 10 December 2008, he agreed it and became one of the signatories. In July 2009, he also participated the 2009 World Outgames for LGBT rights.

On May 10, 2010, Wan Yanhai together with his family fled to the United States of America because of what he considered to be government persecution. In March, tax authorities opened an investigation into the Aizhixing Institute of Health Education.

However, in 2011 tax authorities admitted that they had made an error and returned some 8,000 RMB to Aizhixing Institute.

References

HIV/AIDS activists
Living people
Chinese activists
Charter 08 signatories
1963 births